Hamiltonsbawn or Hamilton's Bawn is a village in County Armagh, Northern Ireland, five miles (8 km) east of Armagh. It lies within the Parish of Mullabrack and the Armagh, Banbridge and Craigavon District Council area.  It had a population of 895 people (343 households) in the 2011 Census.

History

Transport
Hamiltonsbawn railway station opened on 25 August 1864 and finally closed on 1 February 1933.

Education 
Hamiltonsbawn Primary School

Hamiltonban Township, Pennsylvania
The township of Hamiltonban in Adams County, Pennsylvania, was founded by a relative of John Hamilton in the mid-late 18th century, and named after Hamilton's Bawn.

References 

 Armagh towns
Armagh castles
Culture Northern Ireland

See also 

List of towns and villages in Northern Ireland

Villages in County Armagh
Populated places established in 1619
1619 establishments in Ireland